The 1907 All-Massillons football season  was their fifth season in existence. The team was the 1907 incarnation of Massillon Tigers and finished with a record of 7-0-1 and won their fifth Ohio League championship in as many years.

Schedule

Game notes

References

Massillon Tigers seasons
1907 in sports in Ohio
Massillon Tigers